Acartauchenius desertus is a species of sheet weaver found in Kazakhstan. It was described by Tanasevitch in 1993.

References

Linyphiidae
Spiders of Asia
Spiders described in 1993